Gay until 1978, Khatunarkh, is a village in the Armavir Province of Armenia. It was founded in the 1670s, and named for the wife of Sefi Khan. In 1978, it was renamed in honour of Russian Civil War hero Hayk Bzhshkian, whose nom-de-guerre was Gay.

References

World Gazetteer: Armenia – World-Gazetteer.com

Populated places in Armavir Province
Populated places established in the 1670s